A general election was held on 9 April 2014 in Indonesia to renew the mandate of the national and regional legislatures which will expire this year. Official results were announced on 9 May 2014, with the DPR seat allocation being announced separately on 14 May. This is the fourth free and democratic legislative election since the Fall of Suharto in 1998.

List of political parties 
Bold indicates parties that passed the electoral threshold

Parliamentary results

Results by province

Aceh (13)

North Sumatra (30)

West Sumatra (14)

Riau (11)

Jambi (7)

South Sumatra (17)

Bengkulu (4)

Lampung (18)

Bangka Belitung (3)

Riau Islands (3)

Jakarta (21)

West Java (91)

Central Java (77)

Yogyakarta (8)

East Java (87)

Banten (22)

Bali (9)

West Nusa Tenggara (10)

East Nusa Tenggara (13)

West Kalimantan (10)

Central Kalimantan (6)

South Kalimantan (11)

East Kalimantan (8)

North Sulawesi (6)

Central Sulawesi (6)

South Sulawesi (24)

Southeast Sulawesi (5)

Gorontalo (3)

West Sulawesi (3)

Maluku (4)

North Maluku (3)

Papua (10)

West Papua (3)

References 

2014
2014 elections in Indonesia
Election results in Indonesia